Antiphoides is a genus of moths in the family Geometridae. The genus was erected by Frederick H. Rindge in 1990.

Species
Antiphoides dentata Dyar, 1918
Antiphoides errantaria McDunnough, 1940

References

Ennominae
Geometridae genera